The 2014–15 Loyola Marymount Lions women's basketball team represented Loyola Marymount University in the 2014–15 college basketball season. The Lions, members of the West Coast Conference, are led by head coach Charity Elliott, in her third season at the school. The Lions play their home games at the Gersten Pavilion on the university campus in Los Angeles, California. They finished the season 7–24, 4–14 in WCC play to finish in eighth place. They advanced to the quarterfinals of the WCC women's tournament where they lost to Gonzaga.

Roster

Schedule

|-
!colspan=9 style="background:#00345B; color:#8E0028;"| Exhibition

|-
!colspan=9 style="background:#8E0028; color:#00345B;"| Regular Season

|-
!colspan=9 style="background:#00345B;"| 2015 WCC Tournament

Rankings

See also
Loyola Marymount Lions women's basketball

References

Loyola Marymount Lions women's basketball seasons
Loyola Marymount
Loyola Marymount Lions women's basketball
Loyola Marymount Lions women's basketball